William Bridges (1933 – February 17, 2013) was an American author, speaker, and organizational consultant. He emphasized the importance of understanding transitions as a key for organizations to succeed in making changes. He says transition is the psychological process of adapting to change. Transition consists of three phases: letting go of the past, the "neutral zone" where the past is gone but the new isn't fully present, and making the new beginning.

He was educated at Harvard (BA, English), Columbia (MA, American History) and Brown (PhD, American Civilization) Universities  and taught American Literature at Mills College until 1974,when he became a consultant.

Bridges died on February 17, 2013, from complications of Lewy body disease at his home in Larkspur. He was 79.

Books
 Managing Transitions 
 Transitions 
 The Way of Transition 
 Creating You & Co

References

External sources
William Bridges' Amazon Page
wmbridges.com

American male writers
1933 births
2013 deaths
Harvard College alumni
Columbia Graduate School of Arts and Sciences alumni
Brown University alumni
Mills College faculty